John Meresden MD DD (died 7 January 1424 or 1425) was a Canon of Windsor from 1413 to 1425

Career

He was appointed:
Rector of Thurcaston, Lincolnshire

He was appointed to the first stall in St George's Chapel, Windsor Castle in 1413 and held the canonry until 1425.

Notes 

1425 deaths
Canons of Windsor
Year of birth unknown